Bright Moments is a live album by the jazz multi-instrumentalist Rahsaan Roland Kirk. It contains performances by Kirk with Ron Burton, Todd Barkan, Henry Mattathias Pearson, Robert Shy and Joe "Habao" Texidor, recorded at Keystone Korner, San Francisco, in June 1973.

Reception
The AllMusic review by Steve Huey states: "Rahsaan Roland Kirk's live club gigs were usually engaging, freewheeling affairs, full of good humor and a fantastically wide range of music. The double album Bright Moments (reissued as a double CD) is a near-definitive document of the Kirk live experience, and his greatest album of the '70s. The extroverted Kirk was in his element in front of an audience, always chatting, explaining his concepts, and recounting bits of jazz history. Even if some of his long, jive-talking intros can sound a little dated today, it's clear in the outcome of the music that Kirk fed voraciously off the energy of the room... Bright Moments empties all the major items out of Kirk's bag of tricks, providing a neat microcosm of his talents and displaying a consummate and knowledgeable showman. In short, it's nothing less than a tour de force."

Track listing 
All compositions by Rahsaan Roland Kirk except as indicated.
 Introduction - 2:06  
 "Pedal Up" - 11:52  
 "You'll Never Get to Heaven (If You Break My Heart)" (Burt Bacharach, Hal David) - 9:48  
 "Clickety Clack" - 2:30  
 "Prelude to a Kiss" (Duke Ellington, Irving Gordon, Irving Mills) - 5:05  
 "Talk (Electric Nose)" - 2:33  
 "Fly Town Nose Blues" - 8:52  
 "Talk (Bright Moments)" - 3:30  
 "Bright Moments" - 10:02  
 "Dem Red Beans and Rice" - 7:05  
 "If I Loved You" (Oscar Hammerstein II, Richard Rodgers) - 8:50  
 "Talk (Fats Waller)" - 1:30  
 "Jitterbug Waltz" (Richard Maltby Jr., Fats Waller) - 7:00  
 "Second Line Jump" - 1:30
 Recorded at Keystone Korner, San Francisco, CA, June 8 & 9, 1973

Personnel 
 Roland Kirk: tenor saxophone, manzello, stritch, clarinet, flute, nose flute, miscellaneous instruments 
Rahn Burton: piano
 Todd Barkan: synthesizer, tambourine
 Henry Mattathias Pearson: bass
 Robert Shy: drums
 Joe Habao Texidor: percussion

References 

Rahsaan Roland Kirk live albums
1973 live albums
Albums produced by Joel Dorn
Atlantic Records live albums
Albums recorded at Keystone Korner